The No Mercy Festival is an annual heavy metal music festival/tour in Europe. It is organized by the Metallysee booking agency. The 2007 edition will take place from March 31 to April 15, 2007, and it will visit eight countries.

2007 lineup
Moonspell – except in Bielefeld
Napalm Death
Behemoth
Dew-Scented
Root

Additional bands

In Glauchau and Prague
Suffocation

In Antwerp and Tilburg
Obituary
Scarve
Anaal Nathrakh
Extreme Noise Terror

In Tilburg
The Monolith Deathcult
Heidevolk
Mystica
Devious

In London
Hades Lab

2007 dates
March 31 at Planet Music in Vienna, Austria
April 1 at Alte Spinnerei in Glauchau, Germany
April 2 at Abaton in Prague, Czech Republic
April 3 at Postbahnhof in Berlin, Germany
April 4 at Markthalle in Hamburg, Germany
April 5 at Batschkapp in Frankfurt, Germany
April 6 at Movie in Bielefeld, Germany
April 7 at Turock in Essen, Germany
April 8 at Hof Ter Lo in Antwerp, Belgium
April 9 at O13 in Tilburg, Netherlands
April 10 at KOKO in London, England
April 11 at La Locomotive in Paris, France
April 12 at Transbordeur in Lyon, France
April 13 at Z7 in Pratteln, Switzerland
April 14 at Stadthalle in Lichtenfels, Germany
April 15 at Backstage in Munich, Germany

Old lineups

2006
Cannibal Corpse
Grimfist
Kataklysm
Legion of the Damned
Psycroptic
Syrach

2005
Six Feet Under
Nile
Dying Fetus
Disbelief
Cataract
Wykked Wytch

2004
Cannibal Corpse
Hypocrisy
Kataklysm
Carpathian Forest
Vomitory
Exhumed
Spawn of Possession
Esoteric

2003
Testament
Marduk
Death Angel 
Die Apokalyptischen Reiter
Nuclear Assault
Pro-Pain
Malevolent Creation
Darkane

2002
Immortal
Hypocrisy
Vader
Disbelief
Malevolent Creation
Deströyer 666
Catastrophic
Obscenity

2001
Marduk
Amon Amarth
God Dethroned
Mortician
Vader
Sinister
Mystic Circle
...and Oceans
Bal-Sagoth

2000
Deicide
Immortal
Cannibal Corpse
Marduk
Hate Eternal
Vader
Vomitory
Dark Funeral

1999
Morbid Angel
Emperor
Impaled Nazarene
The Crown
Limbonic Art
Peccatum

1998
Cannibal Corpse
God Dethroned
Angelcorpse
Marduk
Obituary
Immortal

1997

Immortal
Küüüüüük!

External links
Official website

Heavy metal festivals in Europe
Concert tours
Heavy metal festivals